Internationally, nonreligious people are less likely to support the use of torture against suspected terrorists than Christians, Buddhists, Hindus, Jews, and the adherents of other religions.

Roman Catholic Church

Throughout the Early Middle Ages, the Catholic Church generally opposed the use of torture during criminal proceedings. This is evident from a letter sent by Pope Nicholas I to Khan Boris of the Bulgars in AD 866, delivered in response to a series of questions from the former and concerned with the ongoing Christianisation of Bulgaria. Ad Consulta Vestra (as entitled in Latin) declared judicial torture to be a practice that was fundamentally contrary to divine law. The Pontiff made it a point of incontrovertible truth that, in his own words: "confession [to a crime] should be spontaneous, not compelled, and should not be elicited with violence but rather proffered voluntarily". He argued for an alternative and more humane procedure, in which the accused person would be required to swear an oath of innocence upon the "holy Gospel that he did not commit [the crime] which is laid against him and from that moment on the matter is [to be put] at an end". Nicholas likewise stressed in the same letter that "those who refuse to receive the good of Christianity and sacrifice and bend their knees to idols" were to be moved towards accepting the true faith "by warnings, exhortations, and reason rather than by force," emphasising to this end that "violence should by no means be inflicted upon them to make them believe. For everything which is not voluntary, cannot be good".

In the High Middle Ages, the church became increasingly concerned with the perceived threat posed to its existence by resurgent heresy, in particular, that attributed to a purported sect known as the Cathars. Catharism had its roots in the Paulician movement in Armenia and eastern Byzantine Anatolia and the Bogomils of the First Bulgarian Empire. Consequently, the church began to enjoin secular rulers to extirpate heresy (lest the ruler's Catholic subjects are absolved from their allegiance), and in order to coerce heretics or witnesses "into confessing their errors and accusing others," decided to sanction the use of methods of torture, already utilized by secular governments in other criminal procedures due to the recovery of Roman Law, in the medieval inquisitions. However, Pope Innocent IV, in the Bull Ad extirpanda (15 May 1252), stipulated that the inquisitors were to "stop short of danger to life or limb".

The modern church's views regarding torture have changed drastically, largely reverting to the earlier stance. In 1953, in an address to the 6th International Congress of Penal Law, Pope Pius XII approvingly reiterated the position of Pope Nicholas the Great over a thousand years before him, when his predecessor had unilaterally opposed the use of judicial torture, stating:  Thus, the Catechism of the Catholic Church (published in 1994) condemns the use of torture as a grave violation of human rights. In No. 2297-2298 it states:

Sharia law
The prevalent view among jurists of sharia law is that torture is not permitted under any circumstances.

In Judaism
Torture has no presence within halakha (Jewish law). There did once exist a system of capital and corporal punishment in Judaism, as well as a flagellation statute for non-capital offences, but it was all abolished by the Sanhedrin during the Second Temple period.

Maimonides issued a ruling in the case of a man who was ordered by a beth din (religious court) to divorce his wife and refused that "we coerce him until he states 'I want to.'" This is only true in cases where specific grounds for the verdict exist. In the 1990s, some activist rabbis had interpreted this statement to mean that torture could be applied against husbands in troubled marriages in order to force them into granting gittin (religious divorces) to their wives. One such group, the New York divorce coercion gang, was broken up by the Federal Bureau of Investigation in 2013.

References

Torture
Religion and violence